The Green Swamp is a swamp in Florida.  It lies west of Highway 27 and east of Interstate 75 in Polk, Lake, Sumter, Hernando and Pasco Counties. The headwaters of the Peace River, Withlacoochee River, Ocklawaha River, and Hillsborough River are located here.

Some 110,000 acres of the swamp are managed as the Green Swamp Wilderness Preserve by the Southwest Florida Water Management District.
Divided into five management units: Colt Creek State Park — 5,067 acres; East Tract — 51,149 acres; Hampton Tract — 11,052 acres; Little Withlacoochee Tract — 4,446 acres; and West Tract — 37,350 acres. Nearly 36 miles of the Withlacoochee River’s 110-mile length are protected as an Outstanding Florida Water within the Green Swamp Wilderness Preserve.

As a plateau above surrounding areas, the Green Swamp region is an important physiographic feature of Florida. Its 560,000 acres of wetlands, flatlands and low ridges are bounded by prominent sandy ridgelines. Rainwater drains across the surface to create the headwaters of four major rivers: the Withlacoochee, the Ocklawaha, the Hillsborough and the Peace. Rainwater also percolates down through the soil to replenish the Floridan aquifer system, the primary source of drinking water for most Floridians. Because the Green Swamp region is elevated above outlying areas and the underground aquifer rises very close to the land surface, the region functions as the pressure head for the aquifer. Protecting the Green Swamp is vital to protecting the quality and quantity of Florida’s water supply. Recognizing the statewide significance of this area, the state of Florida in 1974 designated 322,000 acres of the Green Swamp region as an Area of Critical State Concern.

References

Southwest Florida Water Management District. Green Swamp Wilderness Preserve 
Retrieved from https://www.swfwmd.state.fl.us/recreation/areas/greenswamp.html on 02/15/2015

External links 

S W Florida Water Management District: Green Swamp Wilderness Preserve

Swamps of Florida
Landforms of Polk County, Florida
Landforms of Lake County, Florida
Landforms of Sumter County, Florida
Landforms of Hernando County, Florida
Landforms of Pasco County, Florida